The Temptations were a vocal group from New York best known for the 1960 hit "Barbara".  Issued on Goldisc Records, the song peaked on the Cash Box Magazine chart at #38 and on the Billboard Hot 100 at #29. The flip side song on "Barbara" was "Someday". Other recordings were: "Fickle Little Girl", "Letter of Devotion", "Ballad of Love", and "Tonight My Heart She Is Crying".

Shortly after "Barbara" became a hit, lead singer Neil Stevens left to go solo.
The other members of the group were Larry Curtis, Artie Sands and Artie Marin. The group was managed by Arthur "Artie" Ripp.  He later co-founded Kama Sutra Records and was the first to sign and produce Billy Joel as a solo artist, after Michael Lang, who had given Joel a monetary advance, passed Joel along to Ripp to focus his attentions elsewhere.

References

American vocal groups
Musical groups from New York City